{{Infobox album
| name       = Memorial Album
| type       = Album
| artist     = Clifford Brown
| cover      = Memorial Album.jpg
| alt        =
| released   = Mid September 1956
| recorded   = June 9, 1953 (#1-9)WOR Studios, New York CityAugust 28, 1953 (#10-18)Audio-Video Studios, New York City
| venue      =
| studio     =
| genre      = Jazz
| length     = 71:08
| label      = Blue NoteBLP 1526
| producer   = Alfred Lion
| chronology = Clifford Brown
| prev_title =
| prev_year  =
| next_title = Memorial
| next_year  = 1956
| misc       = {{Extra album cover
 | header  = Alternative cover
 | type    = Album
 | cover   = New_Star_on_the_Horizon.jpg
 | border  =
 | alt     =
 | caption = New Star on the Horizon (BLP 5032, 1954)}}
}}Memorial Album is an album by American jazz trumpeter Clifford Brown composed of tracks recorded at two sessions in 1953 and originally released as a 12" LP on the Blue Note label in September 1956. Apart from a few obscure recordings, the album represents the first tracks recorded under Brown's leadership.

The 2001 RVG Edition of the album features a re-organized track listing and remastering. The first six tracks on this edition were originally released as Lou Donaldson/Clifford Brown - New Faces-New Sounds (BLP 5030), whilst tracks #10-15 were released with the title New Star on the Horizon (BLP 5032), issued in 1954. Also featured here are several alternate takes originally released as Alternate Takes in the U.S. and More Memorable Tracks in Japan as bonus tracks. Van Gelder says in the liner notes that "the original LP mixed various sessions in incomplete form", whilst the CD reissue "presents the music of each session as it was recorded and in complete form."

Reception
Blue Note annotator Bob Blumenthal for the 2001 re-issue called the compilation an early chapter "in the tragically brief legacy of one of the greatest musicians in jazz history. They helped introduce trumpeter Clifford Brown to the world, contributed to his meteoric rise to prominence, and set an incredibly high standard for debut recordings that successive generations have found difficult to match."

The Allmusic review by Alex Henderson stated: "Recorded in 1953, the material on this 18-track CD isn't quite as essential as some of Brown's work with drummer Max Roach in 1954 and 1955, but is still superb... Casual listeners would be better off starting out with some of Brown's recordings with Max Roach; nonetheless, seasoned fans will find that this CD is a treasure chest".

Track listing

2001 CD reissue
 "Bellarosa" (Elmo Hope) - 4:14 Bonus track on CD reissue
 "Carvin' the Rock" (Hope, Sonny Rollins) - 3:56
 "Cookin'" (Lou Donaldson) - 3:14
 "Brownie Speaks" (Brown) - 3:46
 "De-Dah" (Hope) - 4:51
 "You Go to My Head" (J. Fred Coots, Haven Gillespie) - 4:19
 "Carvin' the Rock" [Alternate Take #1] - 3:51 Bonus track on CD reissue 
 "Cookin'" [Alternate Take] - 3:08 Bonus track on CD reissue 
 "Carvin' the Rock" [Alternate Take 2] - 4:05 Bonus track on CD reissue
 "Wail Bait" (Quincy Jones) - 4:02
 "Hymn of the Orient" (Gigi Gryce) - 4:07
 "Brownie Eyes" (Jones) - 3:56 Bonus track on CD reissue
 "Cherokee" (Ray Noble) - 3:27
 "Easy Living" (Ralph Rainger, Leo Robin) - 3:44
 "Minor Mood" (Brown) - 4:34
 "Wail Bait" [Alternate Take] - 4:07 Bonus track on CD reissue
 "Cherokee" [Alternate Take] - 3:42 Bonus track on CD reissue
 "Hymn of the Orient" [Alternate Take] - 4:01 Bonus track on CD reissue

Original 12" LP (1956, BLP 1526)
"Hymn of the Orient"
"Easy Living"
"Minor Mood"
"Cherokee"
"Wail Bait"
"Brownie Speaks"	
"De-Dah"
"Cookin'"
"You Go to My Head"
"Carving the Rock"

New Star on the Horizon 10" LP (1954, BLP 5032)
"Cherokee"
"Easy Living"
"Wail Bait"
"Minor Mood"
"Hymn of the Orient"
"Brownie Eyes"

Personnel
Tracks 1-9
Clifford Brown - trumpet
Lou Donaldson - alto saxophone
Elmo Hope - piano
Percy Heath - bass
Philly Joe Jones - drums

Tracks 10-18
Clifford Brown - trumpet
John Lewis - piano
Gigi Gryce - alto saxophone, flute
Charlie Rouse - tenor saxophone
Percy Heath - bass
Art Blakey - drums

References

Blue Note Records albums
Clifford Brown albums
1956 albums
Albums produced by Alfred Lion